Dolores, Spanish for "pain; grief", most commonly refers to:

 Our Lady of Sorrows or La Virgen María de los Dolores 
 Dolores (given name)

Dolores may also refer to:

Film
 Dolores (2017 film), an American documentary by Peter Bratt
 Dolores (2018 film), an Argentine film

Literature
 "Dolores (Notre-Dame des Sept Douleurs)", a poem by A. C. Swinburne
 Dolores (Susann novel), a 1976 novel by Jacqueline Susann
 Dolores, a 1911 novel by Ivy Compton-Burnett

Music
 Dolores Recordings, a record label
 Dolores (album), an album by Bohren & der Club of Gore
 "Dolores" (song), a 1940 song written by Frank Loesser and Louis Alter and popularized by Bing Crosby
 "Dolores", a song by the Mavericks from Trampoline
 Dolorès, a waltz written by Émile Waldteufel

Places
 1277 Dolores, an asteroid

Argentina
Dolores, Buenos Aires

Belize
Dolores, Belize, a village in Toledo District
Rancho Dolores, a village in Belize District

Colombia
 Dolores, Tolima

El Salvador
Dolores, Cabañas

Guatemala
Dolores, El Petén

Mexico
 Dolores Hidalgo, a town in Guanajuato
 Misión Nuestra Señora de los Dolores del Sur Chillá, Baja California Sur, often shortened to "Dolores"
 Dolores mine, Chihuahua

Nicaragua
 Dolores, Carazo

Philippines
 Dolores, Abra
 Dolores, Eastern Samar
 Dolores, Quezon

Spain
 Dolores, Alicante

United States
 Dolores, Colorado
 Dolores County, Colorado
 Dolores River, a tributary of the Colorado River, in the U.S. states of Colorado and Utah
 Mission San Francisco de Asís, in San Francisco, also known as "Mission Dolores"

Uruguay
 Dolores, Uruguay, a city in Soriano Department

Other uses
 Dolores (Ziegfeld girl), Kathleen Mary Rose (1893–1975), English model and showgirl
 Dolores (artists' model), English artists' model 
 Dolores, the protagonist Mecha from Z.O.E. Dolores, I
 Dolores Madrigal, a character from the animated film Encanto

See also
 Lola (given name), a diminutive form of Dolores
 Lolita (given name), a diminutive form of Lola
 Tropical Storm Dolores, a list of storms